Copicerus is a genus of delphacid planthoppers in the family Delphacidae. There are at least four described species in Copicerus.

Species
These four species belong to the genus Copicerus:

 Copicerus insignicornis (Lethierry, 1890)
 Copicerus irroratus Swartz, 1802
 Copicerus obscurus (Guérin-Méneville, 1856)
 Copicerus swartzi Stål, 1857

References

Further reading

 
 

Auchenorrhyncha genera
Articles created by Qbugbot
Asiracinae